The Ministry for European Integration is an official governmental body in various countries seeking accession to the European Union. It is responsible for integration of Georgia in Europe. It is in Georgia.

Politics of Georgia (country)